Kim Small (born 13 April 1965) is an Australian former field hockey player who competed in the 1988 Summer Olympics.

References

External links
 

1965 births
Living people
Australian female field hockey players
Olympic field hockey players of Australia
Field hockey players at the 1988 Summer Olympics
Olympic gold medalists for Australia
Olympic medalists in field hockey
Medalists at the 1988 Summer Olympics
20th-century Australian women